The 2023 CF Montréal season is the club's 30th season of existence, and their 12th in Major League Soccer, the top tier of the American soccer pyramid.

In addition to competing in the MLS, the club will also play in the Canadian Championship and the Leagues Cup.

Current squad
Source, As of March 20, 2023:

International roster slots 
Montreal currently has seven MLS International Roster Slots for use in the 2022 season. Montreal has eight slots allotted from the league and sold one to St. Louis City SC. In addition, starting in 2022, CF Montreal are allowed to make three international players exempt from status if they have been on the roster for more than one year.

Management

  Joey Saputo – Owner
  Gabriel Gervais – President and Chief Executive Officer
  Olivier Renard – Vice president and Chief Sporting Officer
  Salvatore Rivera – Vice-president & Chief Financial Officer
  Amélie Vaillancourt – Vice-president & Chief Human Resource Officer
  Samia Chebeir – Vice-president and Chief Marketing Officer

Coaching staff

  Hernán Losada – head coach
  Laurent Ciman – assistant coach
  Sebastián Setti – assistant coach
  Eduardo Sebrango – assistant manager
  Hervé Diese – assistant manager
  Romuald Peiser – goalkeeping coach
  Barthélémy Delecroix – fitness Coach
  Stefano Pasquali – assistant fitness Coach
  Louan Schlicht – video Analyst
  Luca Bucci – responsible for the goalkeeping development methodology

Player movement

In 
Per Major League Soccer and club policies terms of the deals do not get disclosed.

Out

Loans in

Loans out

MLS SuperDraft picks

International caps 
Players called for senior international duty during the 2023 season while under contract with the CF Montréal.

Friendlies

Review

Pre-Season 
Unless otherwise noted, all times in EST

Major League Soccer Regular Season

Results

Tables

Eastern Conference

Overall

Results summary

Matches
Unless otherwise noted, all times in Eastern Time

Leagues Cup

Group stage

East 2

Canadian Championship

Bracket

Canadian Championship results

First round

Statistics

Appearances, Minutes Played, and Goals Scored

Top scorers

{| class="wikitable sortable alternance"  style="font-size:85%; text-align:center; line-height:14px; width:85%;"
|-
!width=10|Rank
!width=10|Nat.
! scope="col" style="width:275px;"|Player
!width=10|Pos.
!width=80|MLS
!width=80|Canadian Championship
!width=80|TOTAL
|-
|1||  || Romell Quioto                          || FW ||2||   ||2
|-
|2||  || Chinonso Offor                         || FW ||1||  ||1
|-
|- class="sortbottom"
| colspan="4"|Totals|| 3 || 0  ||3

Italic: denotes player left the club during the season.

Top Assists 

{| class="wikitable sortable alternance"  style="font-size:85%; text-align:center; line-height:14px; width:85%;"
|-
!width=10|Rank
!width=10|Nat.
! scope="col" style="width:275px;"|Player
!width=10|Pos.
!width=80|MLS
!width=80|Canadian Championship
!width=80|TOTAL
|-
|1||  || Mathieu Choinière                      || MF ||1||  || 1
|-
|1||  || Victor Wanyama                         || MF ||1||  ||1 
|-
|- class="sortbottom"
| colspan="4"|Totals|| 2 || 0  ||2

Italic: denotes player left the club during the season.

Goals Against Average 

{| class="wikitable" style="font-size: 95%; text-align: center;"
|-
! rowspan="2" style="width:1%"|No.
! rowspan="2" style="width:90px"|Nat.
! rowspan="2" style="width:25%"|Player
! colspan="3" |Total
! colspan="3" |Major League Soccer
! colspan="3" |Canadian Championship
|-
!MIN!!GA!!GAA!! MIN!!GA!!GAA!! MIN!!GA!!GAA
|-
| 1
|
| style="text-align: left;" |Logan Ketterer
|0
|0
|0.00
|0
|0
|0.00
|0
|0
|0.00
|-
|40
|
| style="text-align: left;" |Jonathan Sirois
|277
|5
|1.62
|277
|5
|1.62
|0
|0
|0.00
|-
|41
|
| style="text-align: left;" |James Pantemis
|83
|2
|2.17
|83
|2
|2.17
|0
|0
|0.00

Italic: denotes player left the club during the season.

Clean sheets 

{| class="wikitable sortable alternance"  style="font-size:85%; text-align:center; line-height:14px; width:85%;"
|-
!width=10|No.
!width=10|Nat.
! scope="col" style="width:225px;"|Player
!width=80|MLS
!width=80|Canadian Championship
!width=80|TOTAL
|-
|1||   || Logan Ketterer               ||  ||   || 
|-
|40||  || Jonathan Sirois                ||  ||  || 
|-
|41||  || James Pantemis                ||  ||  || 
|-
|- class="sortbottom"
| colspan="3"|Totals|| 0 || 0  || 0

Italic: denotes player left the club during the season.

Top minutes played 

{| class="wikitable sortable alternance"  style="font-size:85%; text-align:center; line-height:14px; width:80%;"
|-
!width=10|No.
!width=10|Nat.
!scope="col" style="width:275px;"|Player
!width=10|Pos.
!width=80|MLS
!width=80|Canadian Championship
!width=80|TOTAL
|-
|2 ||  || Victor Wanyama                              || MF ||360 ||  || 360
|-
|4 ||  || |Rudy Camacho                               || DF ||360 ||  || 360
|-
|30||  || Romell Quioto                               || FW ||357 ||  || 357
|-
|3||   || Kamal Miller                                || DF ||332 ||  || 332
|-
|29||  || Mathieu Choinière                           || MF ||312 ||  || 312
|-
|21||  || Lassi Lappalainen                           || FW ||302 ||  || 302
|-
|40|| || Jonathan Sirois                              || GK ||277 ||  || 277
|-
|22||  || Aaron Herrera        || DF ||270 ||  || 270
|-
|19||  || Nathan Saliba                               || MF ||215 ||  || 215
|-
|27||  || Sean Rea                                    || MF ||203 ||  || 203
|-

Italic: denotes player left the club during the season.

Yellow and red cards

Recognition

MLS team of the Week

Notes

References 

CF Montréal seasons
Montreal Impact
Montreal Impact
Montreal Impact